Caribbean Basin Economic Recovery Act of 1983 (CBERA) — P.L. 98-67 (August 5, 
1983), Title II, authorized unilateral preferential trade and tax benefits for eligible Caribbean countries, including duty-free treatment of eligible products.

In pursuant of 97 Stat. 385, beneficiary countries qualified for duty-free treatment. 

Anguilla
Antigua and Barbuda
The Bahamas
Barbados
Belize
Costa Rica
Dominica
Dominican Republic
El Salvador
Grenada
Guatemala
Guyana
Haiti
Honduras
Jamaica
Nicaragua
Panama
Saint Lucia
Saint Vincent and the Grenadines
Suriname
Trinidad and Tobago
Cayman Islands
Montserrat
Netherlands Antilles
Saint Christopher-Nevis
Turks and Caicos Islands
British Virgin Islands

Often referred to as the Caribbean Basin Initiative (CBI). Amended several times, the last substantive revisions were made in the Caribbean Basin Economic Recovery Expansion Act of 1990 (P.L. 101–382, Title II, August 20, 1990).  This made trade benefits permanent (repealing the September 30, 1995 termination date). The law gives preferential trade and tax benefits for eligible Caribbean countries, including duty-free entry of eligible products.  To be eligible, an article must be a product of a beneficiary country and imported directly from it, and at least 35% of its import value must have originated in one or more CBERA beneficiaries. Slightly different import value rules apply to articles entering from Puerto Rico and the Virgin Islands. The duty-free import of sugar and beef products is subject to a special eligibility requirement intended to ensure that increased production of sugar and beef will not adversely affect overall food production. Preferential tariff treatment does not extend to imports of: textiles and apparel subject to textile agreements, specified footwear, canned tuna, petroleum and its products, and watches or watch parts containing any material originating in countries denied normal trade relations (most-favored-nation) trade status. Special criteria applied to the duty-free import of ethanol through FY2000. Import-sensitive products, not accorded duty-free tariff treatment, are eligible to enter at lower than normal trade relations tariff rates. These products include handbags, luggage, flat goods (such as wallets, change purses, and key and eyeglass cases), work gloves, and certain leather wearing apparel.

Caribbean Basin Economic Recovery Law Revisions
Amendments revising the duty-free treatment authorized by the Caribbean Basin Economic Recovery Act.

See also
Caribbean Basin Trade Partnership Act
Caribbean Basin Trade and Partnership Act
Latin American debt crisis

References

External links
  
 
 
 
 
 
 
 
 

1983 in law
98th United States Congress
United States federal agriculture legislation
Economy of the Caribbean
United States foreign relations legislation